Assumption College is a Roman Catholic all—boys private school in Bangkok, Thailand. The school was founded by  Father Emile—August Colombet on 16 February 1885, and is the first school founded by the Order of Brothers of Christian Instruction of St Gabriel. Assumption College is the third—oldest boys school in the country.

The institution is named in honor of the Blessed Virgin Mary under the title “Our Lady of the Assumption”.  The school provides education for students from years 2nd through 13th Grade. The matriculation, especially in the first grade is highly competitive. Assumption College has a long list of distinguished former pupils including four Prime Ministers of Thailand, fifteen privy counselors, and three pupils among Thailand's top ten wealthiest.

Accordingly, it is one of four schools which participates in Jaturamitr Samakkee, a traditional football match by the four oldest boys' schools in Thailand: Suankularb Wittayalai School, Debsirin School, Bangkok Christian College and Assumption College.

History 

Assumption College traces its history to 1885, when Reverend Father Emile—August Colombet, a Roman Catholic French missionary priest, opened a school in Bangkok. In those days before free public schools, Colombet realised many Thai children went without an education. Buddhist monks taught reading and writing in their temples, but attendance was not compulsory. Father Colombet opened his own primary school to help fill the need. The church school, named the Thai-French School, which used French and Thai as the medium of instruction.

Father Colombet's school was in an ordinary wooden house. Classes at the beginning were small; his first student was a Chinese-Thai, Siew Meng Tek. The number of students steadily increased; today more than 57,000 boys have been educated at Assumption College.

On 16 February 1885, the school was formally established under the name of Collège de l'Assomption. On the first day of school, there were 33 students. After that the school gradually became known and the demand for a new study hall was needed. Colombet sent a letter to King Chulalongkorn and the queen and solicited contributions and donations from noblemen and Thai and foreign merchants in Bangkok. The school became well-endowed.

On 15 August 1887, Crown Prince Maha Vajirunhis represented King Chulalongkorn in laying the cornerstone for the construction of the first study hall, later named the "old building" (Thai, "tuek gao").

In 1900, Father Colombet returned to France. He asked the Montfort Brothers of St. Gabriel to assume management of Assumption College. On 20 October 1901, the Superior General of the Brothers of St. Gabriel sent five reverend brothers to Thailand in order to continue the initiative of Father Colombet. They were Rev. Bro. Martin de Tours (the second director), Rev. Bro. Arbaire, Rev. Bro. Augustine, Bro. Gabriel Ferreti, and Rev. Bro. Hilaire, who pursued the objectives of Father Colombet. Assumption College was the first boys' school of the St. Gabriel Foundation in Thailand.

In 1910, the school changed its name from Collège de l'Assomption to Assumption College or AC.

When the number of students sharply increased, the existing study hall could not cater to the increasing numbers. At that time, the Brothers of Saint Gabriel established Assumption College Primary Section in 1965 in Sathon, Bangkok, on an area of six rai.

The primary section was approved and opened on 22 May 1966. The school was officially opened and blessed on 6 May 1967 by Archbishop Joseph Khiamsun Nittayo and Mom Luang Pin Malakul. The minister of education presided at the ceremony.

In 2002, during Brother Surasit Sukchai's term of governance, the English programme (EP) was introduced to serve students who wanted to prepare themselves for international study. The program started in Prathom Suksa 1 and in Mathayom Suksa 1 in the first year. Now the program offers complete primary and secondary levels or from Prathom Suksa 1 to Mathayom Suksa 6.

School symbol
The symbol of Assumption College is a coat of arms. The blue English abbreviation AC is placed mid-center of the coat of arms. Underneath the school's abbreviation is "1885", the year of the college's formal establishment by Colombet. The red and white colors on the coat of arms remind us to honour the nation, religion, and the king. White represents purity and red represents bravery.

Head Masters

Buildings 

Assumption Building (ตึกอัสสัมชัญ) (1890–1970) the first building of Assumption College. King Rama V made a contribution of 50 chang and the queen 25 chang. On 15 August 1887, Crown Prince Maha Vajirunhis laid the foundation stone. On 17 December 1970, the "tuek gao" was demolished to make space for the F. Hilaire Memorial. 
Suwan Somphoch Building (ตึกสุวรรณสมโภช) (1951–2001) built for the 80th anniversary of Assumption College. The first hall of the school.
Assumption 100 years Building (ตึกอัสสัมชัญ 100 ปี) (1985–2004) built for the 100th anniversary of Assumption College. It is a multipurpose building.
Colombet Building (ตึกกอลมเบต์ ) (1936 – present) is the oldest building of Assumption College, used for English program students 
F. Hilaire Building (ตึกฟ.ฮีแลร์) (1972 – present) is the second oldest building. This building was opened by King Bhumibol Adulyadej. This building is used for lower secondary students (grades 7–9).
Assumption 2003 Building (อาคารอัสสัมชัญ 2003) (2003–present) is a 13-storey building and the tallest building at the school. It was designed by alumni architect Ajaphol Dusitanond. The building is mixed-use including the classrooms of upper secondary students (grades 10–12), seven lifts (six for students and one for teachers), labs, school's shop, museum, four auditorium rooms and the director's penthouse on the top of the building.
Saint Louis-Marie Memorial Building (อาคารนักบุญหลุยส์-มารีย์) (2007–present) is the newest building at the school. The building consists of a canteen, library, basketball court and grand hall.

Name 
The word "Assumption" in Catholic doctrine is a reference to the Assumption of the Blessed Virgin Mary.  The school motto is "Labor Omnia Vincit" (English: "Work Triumphs All").

Campuses 
Assumption College has several branches in Thailand, including: 
Assumption College "Primary Section", Bangkok 
Assumption College "Secondary Section", Bangkok

Other campuses in Thailand
Assumption College Lampang
Assumption College Nakhon Ratchasima 
Assumption College Rayong
Assumption College Samutprakarn
Assumption College Sriracha 
Assumption College Thonburi
Assumption College Ubon Ratchathani 
Assumption Commercial College

Notable alumni
The alumni of Assumption College are called Assumptionists (อัสสัมชนิก).

Here are several notable alumni of Assumption College

Former Prime Ministers of Thailand
Phraya Manopakorn Nititada
Khuang Aphaiwong
Sanya Dharmasakti
Seni Pramoj

Scholars, Arts and Architects
Phraya Anuman Rajadhon, modern Thailand's most remarkable scholars; a self-trained linguist, anthropologist and ethnographer who later became an authority on the culture of Thailand. 
Sulak Sivaraksa, the writer and scholar.
Krisda Arunvongse na Ayudhya, the former governor of Bangkok, an architectural lecturer.
Puey Ungphakorn, a former governor of the Bank of Thailand.

Business Leaders
Chartsiri Sophonpanich, president of Bangkok Bank

Religious and Spiritual Leaders
Michael Michai Kitbunchu, the first Cardinal of Thailand, the second Archbishop of Bangkok from 1971 to 2009.
Francis Xavier Kriengsak Kovitvanit, the second Cardinal of Thailand and current Archbishop of Bangkok since 2009.
Phra Paisal Visalo, Buddhist monk and environmental activist.

Entertainment
Anne Jakrajutatip, media entrepreneur.  
Boy Pakorn, actor.
Bundit Ungrangsee, international symphonic conductor.
Suppapong Udomkaewkanjana, TV and film actor.
Krit Amnuaydechkorn, model, actor and singer
Pawat Chittsawangdee, actor.
Metawin Opas-iamkajorn, actor and model

References

Schools in Bangkok
Catholic schools in Thailand
Educational institutions established in 1885
Brothers of Christian Instruction of St Gabriel schools
Boys' schools in Thailand
1885 establishments in Siam
Bang Rak district